The 2009 Hiroshima Toyo Carp season features the Carp quest to win their first Central League title since 1991.

Regular season

Standings

Game log

|-align="center" style="background:#bbffbb;"
| 1 || April 3 || @Giants || 3 - 6 || Lewis (1-0) || Greisinger (0-1) || Nagakawa (1) || 44,124 || 1-0-0
|-align="center" style="background:#bbffbb;"
| 2 || April 4 || @Giants || 3 - 5 || K. Maeda (1-0) || Nakamura (0-1) || Nagakawa (2) || 42,650 || 2-0-0
|-align="center" style="background:#bbbbbb;"
| 3 || April 5 || @Giants || 1 - 1 (12) || colspan=3|Game tied after 12 innings || 42,275 || 2-0-1
|-align="center" style="background:#ffbbbb;"
| 4 || April 7 || @Tigers || 11 - 10 || Egusa (1-0) || Nagakawa (0-1) ||  || 46,307 || 2-1-1
|-align="center" style="background:#ffbbbb;"
| 5 || April 8 || @Tigers || 8 - 2 || Shimoyanagi (1-0) || Saito (0-1) ||  || 42,300 || 2-2-1
|-align="center" style="background:#bbffbb;"
| 6 || April 9 || @Tigers || 2 - 4 || Hasegawa (1-0) || Ishikawa (0-1) || Nagakawa (3) || 38,733 || 3-2-1
|-align="center" style="background:#ffbbbb;"
| 7 || April 10 || Dragons || 3 - 11 || Yoshimi (2-0) || Lewis (1-1) || Nelson (1) || 30,618 || 3-3-1
|-align="center" style="background:#bbffbb;"
| 8 || April 11 || Dragons || 2 - 0 || K. Maeda (2-0) || Shimizu (0-1) ||  || 30,268 || 4-3-1
|-align="center" style="background:#bbffbb;"
| 9 || April 12 || Dragons || 10 - 0 || Shinoda (1-0) || Yamamoto (0-1) ||  || 30,139 || 5-3-1
|-align="center" style="background:#ffbbbb;"
| 10 || April 14 || BayStars || 1 - 4 || Terahara (1-1) || Otake (1-1) || Ishii (2) || 13,436 || 5-4-1
|-align="center" style="background:#bbffbb;"
| 11 || April 15 || BayStars || 3 - 2 || Umetsu (1-0) || Mastny (0-1) || Nagakawa (4) || 17,288 || 6-4-1
|-align="center" style="background:#ffbbbb;"
| 12 || April 16 || BayStars || 1 - 2 (10) || Yamaguchi (2-0) || Nagakawa (0-2) || Ishii (3) || 14,476 || 6-5-1
|-align="center" style="background:#ffbbbb;"
| 13 || April 17 || @Swallows || 6 - 1 || Ishikawa (2-1) || T. Aoki (0-1) ||  || 10,865 || 6-6-1
|-align="center" style="background:#ffbbbb;"
| 14 || April 18 || @Swallows || 1 - 0 || Sato (2-1) || K. Maeda (2-1) || Lim (4) || 25,455 || 6-7-1
|-align="center" style="background:#ffbbbb;"
| 15 || April 19 || @Swallows || 8 - 2 || R. Kawashima (2-1) || Shinoda (1-1) ||  || 17,702 || 6-8-1
|-align="center" style="background:#bbbbbb;"
| — || April 21 || @BayStars || colspan=6|Postponed (rained out)
|-align="center" style="background:#bbffbb;"
| 16 || April 22 || @BayStars || 4 - 5 || Schultz (1-0) || Ishii (0-1) || Nagakawa (5) || 16,948 || 7-8-1
|-align="center" style="background:#bbffbb;"
| 17 || April 23 || @BayStars || 2 - 0 || Saito (1-1) || Walrond (0-2) || Nagakawa (6) || 16,772 || 8-8-1
|-align="center" style="background:#ffbbbb;"
| 18 || April 24 || Tigers || 0 - 4 || Nomi (2-2) || K. Maeda (2-2) ||  || 24,417 || 8-9-1
|-align="center" style="background:#ffbbbb;"
| 19 || April 25 || Tigers || 1 - 12 || Fukuhara (1-2) || Hasegawa (1-1) ||  || 28,400 || 8-10-1
|-align="center" style="background:#bbffbb;"
| 20 || April 26 || Tigers || 2 - 1 || Shinoda (2-1) || Atchison (1-1) || Nagakawa (7) || 30,528 || 9-10-1
|-align="center" style="background:#bbffbb;"
| 21 || April 28 || Giants || 5 - 0 || Otake (1-1) || Utsumi (0-2) ||  || 24,423 || 10-10-1
|-align="center" style="background:#bbffbb;"
| 22 || April 29 || Giants || 2 - 0 || Saito (2-1) || Tono (2-1) || Nagakawa (8) || 31,773 || 11-10-1
|-align="center" style="background:#ffbbbb;"
| 23 || April 30 || Giants || 4 - 7 || Fukuda (2-0) || K. Maeda (2-3) || Ochi (1-1) || 26,322 || 11-11-1
|-

|-align="center" style="background:#bbffbb;"
| 24 || May 2 || Swallows || 9 - 2 || Umetsu (2-0) || Ichiba (1-2) ||  || 31,427 || 12-11-1
|-align="center" style="background:#ffbbbb;"
| 25 || May 3 || Swallows || 2 - 3 || Kida (3-2) || Yokoyama (0-1) || Lim (7) || 31,622 || 12-12-1
|-align="center" style="background:#ffbbbb;"
| 26 || May 4 || Swallows || 3 - 5 || Oshimoto (1-2) || Makino (0-1) || Lim (8) || 31,834 || 12-13-1
|-align="center" style="background:#bbffbb;"
| 27 || May 5 || @Dragons || 0 - 2 || Otake (2-1) || Asakura (2-2) || Nagakawa (9) || 37,494 || 13-13-1
|-align="center" style="background:#ffbbbb;"
| 28 || May 6 || @Dragons || 4 - 2 || Asao (3-3) || Saito (2-2) || Iwase (6) || 36,159 || 13-14-1
|-align="center" style="background:#ffbbbb;"
| 29 || May 7 || @Dragons || 4 - 3 || Saito (2-0) || Umetsu (2-1) ||  || 26,978 || 13-15-1
|-align="center" style="background:#bbffbb;"
| 30 || May 9 || @Swallows || 1 - 4 || Lewis (2-1) || R. Kawashima (2-2) || Nagakawa (10) || 19,119 || 14-15-1
|-align="center" style="background:#ffbbbb;"
| 31 || May 10 || @Swallows || 4 - 1 || Tateyama (3-0) || Hayashi (0-1) || Lim (10) || 14,891 || 14-16-1
|-align="center" style="background:#ffbbbb;"
| 32 || May 12 || @Tigers || 1 - 0 || Shimoyanagi (3-2) || Yokoyama (0-2) ||  || 41,558 || 14-17-1
|-align="center" style="background:#bbffbb;"
| 33 || May 13 || @Tigers || 1 - 2 (10) || Yokoyama (1-2) || Fujikawa (1-2) || Nagakawa (11) || 43,899 || 15-17-1
|-align="center" style="background:#ffbbbb;"
| 34 || May 14 || @Tigers || 7 - 1 || Ando (3-2) || K. Maeda (2-4) ||  || 40,599 || 15-18-1
|-align="center" style="background:#ffbbbb;"
| 35 || May 15 || Giants || 2 - 5 || Gonzalez (3-0) || T. Aoki (0-2) || Kroon (7) || 30,164 || 15-19-1
|-align="center" style="background:#bbbbbb;"
| 36 || May 16 || Giants || 0 - 0 (12) || colspan=3|Game tied after 12 innings || 29,794 || 15-19-2
|-align="center" style="background:#ffbbbb;"
| 37 || May 17 || Giants || 1 - 2 || Ochi (3-1) || Nagakawa (0-3) || Kroon (8) || 29,707 || 15-20-2
|-align="center" style="background:#bbffbb;"
| 38 || May 19 || @Buffaloes || 1 - 9 || Otake (3-1) || Kondo (3-3) ||  || 9,887 || 16-20-2
|-align="center" style="background:#ffbbbb;"
| 39 || May 20 || @Buffaloes || 10 - 3 || Yamamoto (3-2) || K. Maeda (2-5) ||  || 11,107 || 16-21-2
|-align="center" style="background:#ffbbbb;"
| 40 || May 22 || @Hawks || 6 - 3 || Wada (3-2) || Lewis (2-2) || Mahara (6) || 29,327 || 16-22-2
|-align="center" style="background:#ffbbbb;"
| 41 || May 23 || @Hawks || 5 - 4 || Mizuta (2-0) || Saito (2-3) || Mahara (7) || 32,221 || 16-23-2
|-align="center" style="background:#bbffbb;"
| 42 || May 24 || Lions || 7 - 5 || Komatsu (1-0) || Nishiguchi (3-2) || Nagakawa (12) || 28,309 || 17-23-2
|-align="center" style="background:#bbffbb;"
| 43 || May 25 || Lions || 3 - 0 || Otake (4-1) || Kishi (6-1) || Nagakawa (13) || 24,558 || 18-23-2
|-align="center" style="background:#bbffbb;"
| 44 || May 27 || Marines || 8 - 3 || K. Maeda (3-5) || Karakawa (4-3) ||  || 22,513 || 19-23-2
|-align="center" style="background:#bbffbb;"
| 45 || May 28 || Marines || 4 - 3 || Lewis (3-2) || H. Kobayashi (0-4) || Nagakawa (14) || 12,048 || 20-23-2
|-align="center" style="background:#bbbbbb;"
| — || May 30 || @Eagles || colspan=6|Postponed (rained out)
|-align="center" style="background:#bbffbb;"
| 46 || May 31 || @Eagles || 4 - 5 || Otake (5-1) || Iwakuma (5-3) || Nagakawa (15) || 18,015 || 21-23-2
|-

|-align="center" style="background:#bbffbb;"
| 47 || June 1 || @Eagles || 0 - 2 || Saito (3-3) || Hasebe (3-4) || Nagakawa (16) || 10,402 || 22-23-2
|-align="center" style="background:#bbffbb;"
| 48 || June 2 || @Fighters || 1-2 || K. Maeda (4-5) || Itokazu (0-2) || Nagakawa (17) || 20,252 || 23-23-2
|-align="center" style="background:#ffbbbb;"
| 49 || June 3 || @Fighters || 7-2 || Tateyama (2-2) || Yokoyama (1-3) ||  || 22,257 || 23-24-2
|-align="center" style="background:#bbffbb;"
| 50 || June 5 || Hawks || 4-1 (7) || Mori (1-0) || Ohba (0-2) || Schultz (1) || 28,814 || 24-24-2
|-align="center" style="background:#ffbbbb;"
| 51 || June 6 || Hawks || 1-11 (7) || Germano (1-0) || Ohtake (5-2) ||  || 31,737 || 24-25-2
|-align="center" style="background:#bbffbb
| 52 || June 7 || Buffaloes || 6-1 || Sato (4-3)|| Hirano (2-2) ||  || 28,747 || 25-25-2
|-
| 53 || June 8 || Buffaloes ||  ||  ||  ||  ||  || 
|-
| 54 || June 10 || @Marines ||  ||  ||  ||  ||  || 
|-
| 55 || June 11 || @Marines ||  ||  ||  ||  ||  || 
|-
| 56 || June 13 || @Lions ||  ||  ||  ||  ||  || 
|-
| 57 || June 14 || @Lions ||  ||  ||  ||  ||  || 
|-
| 58 || June 17 || Eagles ||  ||  ||  ||  ||  || 
|-
| 59 || June 18 || Eagles ||  ||  ||  ||  ||  || 
|-
| 60 || June 20 || Fighters ||  ||  ||  ||  ||  || 
|-
| 61 || June 21 || Fighters ||  ||  ||  ||  ||  || 
|-
| 62 || June 26 || Dragons ||  ||  ||  ||  ||  || 
|-
| 63 || June 27 || Dragons ||  ||  ||  ||  ||  || 
|-
| 64 || June 28 || Dragons ||  ||  ||  ||  ||  || 
|-
| 65 || June 30 || @Giants ||  ||  ||  ||  ||  || 
|-

Player stats

Batting

Pitching

References

Hiroshima Toyo Carp
Hiroshima Toyo Carp seasons